How to Rob a Bank (and 10 Tips to Actually Get Away with It) is an American independent crime comedy film. It finished filming in March 2006. It premiered at the 2007 Los Angeles Film Festival, and opened in limited release in the United States on February 8, 2008. The film is about a man who gets caught in the middle of a bank robbery, ending up in the vault with one of the robbers he then treats as a hostage. After grossing $1,006 in the domestic market, the film was released on DVD on September 2, 2008. The film makes many references to the famous British pop band Duran Duran.

Plot 
As he tries to access an ATM to retrieve his last twenty bucks, Jason “JINX” Taylor runs into a snag – the transaction fee will overdraw him, and he cannot get his money out of the bank. Jinx fumes about this and other hidden charges which complicate his life…as we realize that he is locked in a bank vault…with the beautiful but tied-up Jessica, her apparently a hostage. Jessica is kept gagged with tape on her mouth. But, as Jinx rails against corporations and how they stack the deck, we realize that the situation is very different from what it appears: in fact, it is Jessica, not Jinx, who is robbing the bank. She is aligned with Simon, who leads an armed team inside the branch. However, Jinx’s entry into the scenario upsets the heist, leading him and Jessica to be inadvertently locked inside the vault. In addition, Jinx has called the cops, who, led by Officer DeGepse, have surrounded the bank. Jinx makes contact with Simon by cell phone, and the situation becomes clearer, as he realizes Jessica has access to a special inside-the-vault computer and its codes…she and only she can open the vault door. Simon becomes increasingly upset when he is unable to strong-talk Jinx into getting the vault open (so the robbers can clear out the safe deposit boxes). And DeGepse is equally frustrated by the standoff, particularly when it is Jinx, not he, who seems to gain control over the situation.

As things progress, Jinx realizes that he and Jessica actually think very much alike – they both feel used – and this new kinship leads them to plot an escape. A call comes in from Nick, the true mastermind of the robbery, and Jinx and Jessica realize that Nick needs them to issue a PIN for him to access funds which have been skimmed (from fees, of course) over the course of years. With Simon increasingly unstable, Jinx is able to manipulate both him and DeGepse while also making a deal with Nick to provide a PIN (controlled by Jinx and Jessica) to go with Nick’s account information. Jinx manages to talk both cops and robbers into letting Jessica and him out, as freed hostages, and in the ensuing chaos, they slip away, to meet Nick and escape with their cut of the cash…

Cast 
 Nick Stahl as Jason Taylor, or Jinx, The Innocent Civilian.
 Erika Christensen as Jessica, The Hostage.
 Gavin Rossdale as Simon, The Leader of the Bank Robbers and the main antagonist of the film.
 Terry Crews as Officer DeGepse, in charge of the negotiations.
 Leo Fitzpatrick as Gunman, a henchman.
 Adriano Aragon as Officer Linstrom, DeGepse's partner.
 David Carradine as Nick, the mastermind and main villain of the film.

References

External links 
 
 
 
 
 
 

2007 films
2000s crime comedy films
2000s heist films
2007 independent films
American crime comedy films
American heist films
American independent films
Films about bank robbery
IFC Films films
2000s English-language films
2000s American films